Japanese musician Kenichi Maeyamada, also known as Hyadain, has produced music for idol musicians, anime, games, pop musicians and television shows. Maeyamada's first production was in 2004, for the Super Eurobeat Presents Initial D Fourth Stage D Selection+ album song "Don't Go Baby", where he was credited as ED. He began producing songs for artists full-time in 2007 and 2008, including music for the anime Kirarin Revolution, including the theme songs "Tan Tan Taan!" and "Hapi Hapi Sunday!", both of which were Oricon top 10 hits. In 2009, Maeyamada produced the singles "It's All Love!" for Kumi Koda x Misono, and the anime One Piece theme song "Share the World" by TVXQ, both of which reached number 1.

Maeyamada produces much of the music released by Stardust Promotion idol groups, including Momoiro Clover Z, Shiritsu Ebisu Chugaku, Tacoyaki Rainbow and Dish. This includes Momoiro Clover's major label debut single "Ikuze! Kaitō Shōjo" (2010), "Z Densetsu: Owarinaki Kakumei" (2011) and "Mugen no Ai" (2012), all of which have been certified gold. Maeyamada also produces for Toy's Factory idol group Dempagumi.inc and occasionally AKB48 related groups, most notable No3b, and several Johnny's Entertainment acts.

Maeyamada has produced theme songs, character singles and background music for various anime, including Mitsudomoe, Squid Girl and Denpa Onna to Seishun Otoko. He writes all of the songs for the NHK Educational TV program Rekishi ni Dokiri, which feature Nakamura Shidō II performing small skits about famous figures from Japanese history.

Songs produced for other artists

Artist Single / Album Works

Anime Works

Game Works

Music director

References

Production discographies
Discographies of Japanese artists